First Bank is a Romanian bank, owned and managed by U.S. investment firm J.C. Flowers & Co. The bank was established in 1995 as Pater Bank, after which it was acquired and renamed by Piraeus Bank in 2000.

Piraeus Bank sold its Romanian subsidiary to J.C. Flowers & Co. on 28 June 2018, who changed the bank's name to First Bank on 12 September 2018.

In April 2020, First Bank acquired and absorbed the Romanian subsidiary of Bank Leumi.

As of July 2018, the shareholder structure of the bank is as follows:
 J.C. Flowers & Co. - 76.1%
 EBRD - 19%
 Natural persons - 4.9%

See also

 List of banks in Romania
 J.C. Flowers & Co.

References

External links

Banks of Romania